A list of Spanish-produced and co-produced feature films released in Spain in 1993.

Films

Box office 
The five highest-grossing Spanish films in 1993, by domestic box office gross revenue, are as follows:

See also 
 8th Goya Awards
 1993 in film

References

External links
 Spanish films of 1993 at the Internet Movie Database

1993
Spanish
Films